The 2024 Six Nations Championship (known as the Guinness Six Nations for sponsorship reasons) is a rugby union competition scheduled to take place in February and March 2024, featuring the men's national teams of England, France, Ireland, Italy, Scotland and Wales. It is the 130th season of the competition (including its incarnations as the Home Nations Championship and the Five Nations Championship), but the 25th since it expanded to become the Six Nations Championship in 2000. It will start on 2 February 2024 with a Friday night match between France and Ireland, and end with France against England on 16 March. France will play all three of their home fixtures away from their normal venue, the Stade de France in Saint-Denis, as the stadium is scheduled to be being prepared for use in the 2024 Summer Olympics later in the year.

Fixtures

Round 1

Round 2

Round 3

Round 4

Round 5

References

2024
2024 rugby union tournaments for national teams
2023–24 in European rugby union
2023–24 in Irish rugby union
2023–24 in English rugby union
2023–24 in Welsh rugby union
2023–24 in Scottish rugby union
2023–24 in French rugby union
2023–24 in Italian rugby union
February 2024 sports events in Europe
March 2024 sports events in Europe